Kayumars is the first man in Persian mythology.

Kayumars may also refer to:
 Shamsuddin Kayumars, a sultan of the Delhi Sultanate
 Kayumarth III, a mediaeval ruler from the Paduspanid dynasty in northwestern Iran